Kunigunde of Poland (Kunegunda) (c. 1298 – 9 April 1331) was a daughter of Władysław I the Elbow-high and his wife Jadwiga of Greater Poland. Her siblings included, Casimir III of Poland and Elisabeth, Queen of Hungary. She was a member of the House of Piast.

Biography 
Kunigunde's father was a bitter rival with Wenceslaus II of Bohemia who was King of Poland between 1291–1305. Life was dangerous for Kunigunde, her mother and her siblings during this time, she, her mother and two of her siblings had to go into hiding for a while during 1300. In 1305, Wenceslaus II died and was succeeded by his son, Wenceslaus III of Bohemia. Wenceslaus III reigned for a year before he was assassinated under mysterious circumstances so his campaign of Poland ended. His wife, Viola Elisabeth of Cieszyn had not bore him any children so his successor was Władysław.

In 1318, Władysław embarked on a coronation campaign. The pope, though initially unwilling, finally granted his approval and so Kunigunde's parents were crowned King and Queen of Poland on 30 January 1320 in Kraków.

Marriages 
Kunigunde married Bernard of Świdnica, the couple had two sons and three daughters:
Bolko II of Świdnica (d.1368), succeeded his father.
Henry II of Świdnica (d.1348), succeeded his childless brother and was father of Anne of Świdnica, wife of Charles IV, Holy Roman Emperor.
Constance of Świdnica, married to Przemko II of Głogów.
Elisabeth of Świdnica, married to Bolko II of Opole.
Beata of Świdnica, who died young.

Bernard died in 1326 and left Kunigunde as a widow, their with five children.

In 1328, Kunigunde married a second time, she married Rudolf I, Duke of Saxe-Wittenberg. The marriage produced one son, Mieszko (b. ca. 1330 - d. 1350). Kunigunde died in 1333. Rudolf I remarried and in 1355 was proclaimed Elector of Saxony, one year before his own death.

Ancestors

Kunigunde's ancestors in three generations

In popular culture

Film 
Duchess Kunigunde is played by Anna Grycewicz in Polish historical drama TV series "Korona królów" ("The Crown of the Kings"). She is a recurring character in the first season.

References

External links
 Cunégonde Piast

1298 births
1331 deaths
Piast dynasty
Polish princesses
Duchesses of Saxe-Wittenberg
13th-century Polish women
14th-century Polish women
13th-century Polish people
14th-century Polish people
Daughters of kings